Percona Server for MySQL is a distribution of the MySQL relational database management system created by Percona. 

Percona Server for MySQL is an open source relational database management system (RDBMS). It is a free, fully compatible drop in replacement for Oracle MySQL. The software includes a number of scalability, availability, security and backup features only available in MySQL's commercial Enterprise edition. The software includes XtraDB, an enhanced distribution of the InnoDB Storage Engine.

The developers aim to retain close compatibility to the official MySQL releases, while focusing on performance and increased visibility into server operations.

See also

 Comparison of relational database management systems

References

Client-server database management systems
Cross-platform software
Free database management systems
Relational database management software for Linux
MySQL
Software forks
Software using the GPL license